Tinana is a waka used by early Māori migrators.

Tinana may also refer to:

 Tiñana, a parish in Siero, Asturias, Spain
 Tinana, Queensland
 Shire of Tinana, a former local government area in Queensland, Australia

See also